Jianhu County is under the administration of Yancheng, Jiangsu province, China. It borders the prefecture-level cities of Huai'an and Yangzhou to the west.

The main town in Jianhu is commonly just called Jianhu, and sometimes Huduo or “Hutu“ (“糊涂“).

Administrative divisions
In the present, Jianhu County includes 12 towns.   

-Former Towns
 Yanshan - is merged to other.
 Gangdong - is merged to other.
 Caoyankou - is merged to other.
 Zhongzhuang - is merged to other.

Climate

Education
There are two key senior high schools in Jianhu County. One is Jianhu Senior High School, which is located in Downtown Jianhu. The other one is Shanggang Senior High School, which is located in Downtown Shanggang.

Transportation
Recent development of transportation infrastructure in Northern Jiangsu has greatly impacted Great Yancheng area, including Jianhu.  The Jianhu train station opened in July 2004, and Jianhu now offers overnight train service (on Train Z156) to Beijing.

References

External links
Jianhu site (Chinese)
Jianhu City English guide (Jiangsu.NET)

County-level divisions of Jiangsu
Yancheng